There are fourteen Iowa Byways in the U.S. state of Iowa. Two are also designated as National Scenic Byways.

National Scenic Byways

Iowa scenic byways

External links
 Iowa DOT - Iowa's Byways
https://www.traveliowa.com/getinspired/the-scenic-route/12/

Iowa
 Scenic